Llanhamlach is a village in rural Powys, Wales about 4 miles east of Brecon, in the community of Llanfrynach. It had a railway junction called Talyllyn Junction.

History 
Previously part of Brecknock Rural District, Llanhamlach was in the county of Brecknockshire before becoming part of Powys. A standing stone, called the Peterstone, is along the course of a suspected Roman Road.

Church 
There is a church dedicated to the saints Peter and Illtyd, which is noted for an early medieval carving of two exhibitionist figures.

References 

Villages in Powys